Abu Risha may refer to:
 Abdul Sattar Abu Risha (1972–2007), an Iraqi Sunni tribal sheikh and leader of the Anbar Salvation Council
 Ahmed Abu Risha, brother of Abdul Sattar Abu Risha who took over as leader of the Anbar Salvation Council